Benediktus Tambonop (27 May 1975 – 13 January 2020) is an Indonesian politician who served as Regent of Boven Digoel from 2016 until his death in 2020. This 1999 alumnus of STPDN Jatinangor started his career as a bureaucrat in the government environment Merauke Regency before finally being elected as regent in 2016.

Career 
Benediktus had a career as a bureaucrat after graduating from the STPDN Jatinangor in 1999. In 2001, he became Secretary of the head of district Kimaam and head of district Jair in Merauke Regency. He again became the camat or district head, this time in Mandobo, Merauke in 2003. Benediktus served as Head of Administration Boven Digoel twice, in 2005–2010 and 2011–2014. He was the head of the TTG BPMK Division of Boven Digoel Regency in 2010. Prior to being elected as regent, his last position in the Boven Digoel government was as Assistant 1 for Government Affairs at the Regional Secretariat of Boven Digoel Regency in 2014.

In concurrent local elections in 2015, he ran as candidate for Regent of Boven Digoel in pairs with candidate for deputy regent Chaerul Anwar, this pair is supported by PDI Perjuangan and United Development Party. Benedict won the election with 13,927 votes or 46.01%. They managed to defeat three other pairs, one of which was the incumbent regent Yesaya Merasi. Benediktus and Chaerul were sworn in by Governor Lukas Enembe on April 29, 2016.

References 

1975 births
2020 deaths
Papuan people
People from Merauke